Magistad is a surname. Notable people with the surname include:

Inga Magistad (born 1950), Norwegian diplomat
Mary Kay Magistad, American journalist

Norwegian-language surnames